Greendell is an unincorporated community located within Green Township, in Sussex County, New Jersey, United States. Greendell has a post office with ZIP code 07839.

References

Green Township, New Jersey
Unincorporated communities in Sussex County, New Jersey
Unincorporated communities in New Jersey